The Mainspring of Human Progress, by Henry Grady Weaver, is a libertarian history book published in 1947 by Talbot Books. In 1953, the Foundation for Economic Education printed a revised edition and has done all subsequent printings. The book borrows heavily from the 1943 Rose Wilder Lane book The Discovery of Freedom.

Relation to The Discovery of Freedom
Rose Wilder Lane's book The Discovery of Freedom: Man's Struggle Against Authority was printed in 1943. It received good reviews, notably from Albert Jay Nock, but Lane was dissatisfied with it and would not give permission to reprint it. Only one thousand copies were printed in her lifetime. The continuing interest in her book prompted Weaver to write his book.
In The Modern Library's readers poll of the 100 best nonfiction books (conducted 4/29/1999 through 9/30/1999), The Mainspring of Human Progress was ranked #48 and The Discovery of Freedom was #67.

On libertarianism and religion
Weaver, like Lane and Isabel Paterson, saw libertarianism as being derived from Christian faith. This put them at odds with objectivists such as Ayn Rand and Nathaniel Branden, who declared libertarianism to be incompatible with religion. (Ayn Rand was opposed to the Libertarian Movement.) Quotations from Weaver's book illustrate this view:

Pagan worship is based on the idea that human destiny is controlled by the overall will-of-the tribe, rather than by the initiative and free will of the individual persons who make up the tribe....it is in this concept that we find the origin of human sacrifice to the pagan gods. page 31)

[Christ] spoke of the God of Abraham, the God of Truth, the God of Rightness – the God who does not control any man, but who judges the acts of every man. (page 79)

All of these advantages are the natural, normal outgrowth of a political structure which unleashed the creative energies of millions of men and women by leaving them free to work out their own affairs – not under the lash of coercive authority, but through voluntary cooperation based on enlightened self-interest and moral responsibility. (page 251)

There has never been but one revolution. It is the revolution against pagan fatalism – the revolution for human freedom. (page 68)

Although Weaver's own denomination was Southern Baptist, the book (in common with The Discovery of Freedom) is very positive towards Islam. He sees Muhammad's teaching consistent with libertarian ideals and his sympathy is on the side of the Moslems during the Crusades.

References

External links
 The Mainspring of Human Progress

Books about capitalism
1947 non-fiction books
Libertarianism in the United States
Books about economic history
Libertarian books